Bank of America Tower may refer to:

 Bank of America Corporate Center, the bank's headquarters in Charlotte, North Carolina, United States
 110 North Wacker, Chicago, Illinois, United States
 Bank of America Tower (Fort Worth), Texas, United States
 Bank of America Tower (Hong Kong), Victoria City, Hong Kong
 Bank of America Tower (Jacksonville), Florida, United States
 Bank of America Tower (Manhattan), New York, United States
 Bank of America Tower (Phoenix), Arizona, United States

Buildings formerly known as the Bank of America Tower:
 555 California Street, San Francisco, California, United States
 Albuquerque Plaza, New Mexico, United States
 Columbia Center, Seattle, Washington, United States
 Miami Tower, Florida, United States
 One Progress Plaza, St. Petersburg, Florida, United States

See also
 Bank of America Building (disambiguation)
 Bank of America Center (disambiguation)
 Bank of America Plaza (disambiguation)